Rome Odunze (born June 3, 2002) is an American football wide receiver for the Washington Huskies.

High school career
Odunze attended Bishop Gorman High School in Las Vegas, Nevada. As a senior in 2019, he was the Gatorade Football Player of the Year for Nevada after recording 54 catches for 1,222 yards and 15 touchdowns. For his career, he had 121 receptions for 2,699 yards and 31 touchdowns. Odunze committed to the University of Washington to play college football.

College career
As a true freshman at Washington in 2020, Odunze played in all four games and had six receptions for 72 yards. As a sophomore in 2021, he started seven of nine games, recording 41 receptions for 415 yards and four touchdowns. He returned to Washington as a starter in 2022.

References

External links
Washington Huskies bio

Living people
Players of American football from Nevada
Bishop Gorman High School alumni
American football wide receivers
Washington Huskies football players
2002 births